George N. Abramson (May 13, 1903 – March 15, 1985) was a guard, tackle, and kicker in the National Football League who played for the Minnesota Golden Gophers and the Green Bay Packers. He was born in Eveleth, Minnesota.

Personal life
Abramson (known as George Abrahamson in his childhood) was born in Eveleth, Minnesota, spent his childhood in Aurora, MN, and graduated from Aurora High School in 1919.  He moved to Virginia with his family in 1920. After that he started a furniture business where he had 3 stores around Illinois and retired to the Bay Area in 1964.

Abramson was Jewish and was said to speak Yiddish with a Jewish teammate on the field during games in college. He was cousins with Arthur Naftalin, the first Jewish mayor of Minneapolis.

After his football career, he moved to Kewanee, Illinois and then to California. He died in 1985.

College career
Abramson played for the Minnesota Golden Gophers. During the 1922 and 1923 seasons, he was named as an honorable mention to the Walter Camp All-American team. In 1924, he was named second-team All-American and first-team All-Western Conference.

At Minnesota, Abramson was a member of the Sigma Alpha Mu fraternity.

Professional career
Abramson played 10 games for the Green Bay Packers, where he's recorded as having made two field goals and two extra points. He attempted and made the first fair catch kick in NFL history.

Professional stats

References

1903 births
1985 deaths
People from Eveleth, Minnesota
Minnesota Golden Gophers football players
Green Bay Packers players
Players of American football from Minnesota
American football guards